Tarik Kopty (20 August 1944 – 24 February 2022) was an Arab-Israeli actor. He acted in multiple films which appeared at the Cannes Film Festival.

Kopty died in Nazareth on 24 February 2022, at the age of 77.

Filmography
The Barbecue People (2003)
The Gospel According to God (2004)
The Syrian Bride (2004)
The Band's Visit (2007)
The Little Traitor (2007)
Lemon Tree (2008)
Pillars of Smoke (2009)
 (2010)
Inheritance (2012)
Zaytoun (2012)
Omar (2013)
Bethlehem (2013)
A Borrowed Identity (2014)

References

1944 births
2022 deaths
20th-century Israeli male actors
21st-century Israeli male actors
Arab citizens of Israel
People from Nazareth